The 1927 Cleveland Bulldogs season was their fourth season in the league. The team improved on their previous output of 5–8–1, winning eight games. They finished fourth in the league. The team relocated to Detroit, Michigan after the season, playing one season as the Detroit Wolverines in 1928.

Schedule

Standings

References

Cleveland Bulldogs seasons
Cleveland Bulldogs
Cleveland Bulldogs